Drag or The Drag may refer to:

Places
 Drag, Norway, a village in Tysfjord municipality, Nordland, Norway
 Drág, the Hungarian name for Dragu Commune in Sălaj County, Romania
 Drag (Austin, Texas), the portion of Guadalupe Street adjacent to the University of Texas at Austin

Science and technology 
 Drag (physics), the force which resists motion of an object through a fluid
 Drag equation, a mathematical equation used in analyzing the magnitude of drag caused by fluid flow
 Drag coefficient, a non-dimensional coefficient that is one of the terms in the drag equation
 Aerodynamic drag, the aerodynamic force which resists motion of an aircraft or other object through the air
 Drag crisis, a rapid change in drag coefficient over a small range of Reynolds number
 Drag parachute, a parachute to reduce the speed of vehicles
 Park drag, a type of carriage
 Police drag, a small dredge used to recover objects or bodies lost in shallow water
 Drag harrow, in agriculture, a heavy type of harrow used to break up soil
 Drag link, a component commonly used in automotive steering systems
 Drag system, a mechanical means of applying variable pressure to a fishing rod reel in order to act as a friction brake
 Drag and drop, a computer input gesture

Arts and entertainment 
 Drag (clothing), the clothing associated with one gender role when worn by a person of another gender
Drag: Combing Through the Big Wigs of Show Business, a history book of drag queens by Frank DeCaro

Film and theatre
 The Drag (play), a Mae West play
 Drag (film), a 1929 drama film directed by Frank Lloyd
 The Drag (film), a 1966 Canadian animated short

Music
 To drag, in music, to play slower than the indicated tempo
 Drag (percussion), in drumming, one of the 26 rudiments, or basic patterns used in rudimental drumming

Artists
 Drag (band), an Australian band

Genres
 Witch house (music genre), a subgenre of dark electronic music
 Slow Drag (dance), a genre of blues dancing

Recordings
 Drag (k.d. lang album), a 1997 album by k.d. lang
 Drag (Red Aunts album), an album by the Red Aunts
 "Drag", a song by King Adora released on the single "Drag/9" Of Pure Malice"
 "The Drag", a song by Ty Segall from the album Ty Segall
 "Drag", a song by Hole released on the single "Malibu"
 "Drag", a song by Ronnie Linares and The Del-Aires
 "Drag", a song by Steve Wynn
 "Drag", a single by surf-pop singer Day Wave

Sport 
 Drag (route), in American football
 Drag racing, a form of automobile racing
 Drag suit, a type of training swimwear.
 Drag hunting, a form of hunting with hounds

Other uses
 A deep inhalation of a cigarette, in slang
 Dragging death, a death caused by someone being dragged behind or underneath a moving vehicle or animal.

See also
 Drag strip (disambiguation)